Phillip Jordan Ellis "Jordie" Benn (born July 26, 1987) is a Canadian professional ice hockey defenceman for the Toronto Marlies in the American Hockey League (AHL) while under contract to the Toronto Maple Leafs of the National Hockey League (NHL). An undrafted player, Benn has previously played for the Dallas Stars, Montreal Canadiens, Vancouver Canucks, Winnipeg Jets and Minnesota Wild. He is the older brother of Dallas Stars captain Jamie Benn.

Playing career
Undrafted, Benn played in the British Columbia Hockey League with the Victoria Grizzlies. Originally signing a letter of intent with the University of Alaska Fairbanks in 2006, Benn deferred and later opted to forgo a collegiate career to remain in Victoria and make his professional debut with the Victoria Salmon Kings of the ECHL in the 2008–09 season. With his younger brother, Jamie, cementing his role as a prominent forward for the Dallas Stars, Benn secured his unconventional pathway up the ranks through the Stars' affiliates in the ECHL and American Hockey League.

Dallas Stars

After the 2010–11 season with the Texas Stars, Benn signed his first NHL contract in agreeing to a one-year, two-way deal with the Dallas Stars on July 2, 2011. In the following 2011–12 season, on January 3, 2012, Benn made his NHL debut against the Detroit Red Wings. He recorded his first NHL point, also assisted by Jamie on a goal by Loui Eriksson.

As an impending free agent following the 2015–16 season, Benn opted to remain with the Stars, signing a three-year, $3.3 million contract on June 24, 2016.

Montreal Canadiens
In the midst of the 2016–17 season, Benn's tenure with the Stars came to an end after 7 years, as he was traded prior to the deadline to the Montreal Canadiens in exchange for Greg Pateryn and a fourth-round draft pick in 2017 on February 27, 2017. On March 4, 2017, Benn scored his first goal with the Canadiens in a 4–1 victory against New York Rangers in Madison Square Garden.

When playing against his former team the following season against his brother, Benn said:

 Obviously there’s a bit of a shadow when your brother [Jamie Benn] is the superstar of the Stars,” Benn said on Tuesday morning. “I never thought about it like that but obviously everybody could see it. It was nice to get away and just play my game and be myself.

Vancouver Canucks
On July 1, 2019, Benn returned to his home province in signing as a free agent to a two-year, $4 million contract with the Vancouver Canucks. On February 10, 2020, Benn scored his first goal with the Canucks in a 6–2 win over the Nashville Predators.

Winnipeg Jets
In his final year under contract with the Canucks in the  season, Benn was dealt at the trade deadline to the Winnipeg Jets for a 2021 sixth-round pick on April 12, 2021. In the closing stages of the regular season Benn, was competing with Logan Stanley and Ville Heinola for playing time, registering 1 assist through 8 games. He featured in 3 playoff contests with the Jets, before ending his tenure with the club following a second-round series defeat to the Montreal Canadiens.

Minnesota Wild
As a free agent, Benn signed a one-year, $900,000 contract to join his fifth NHL club, the Minnesota Wild, on August 27, 2021. Benn played in 39 games registering one goal and 8 points.

Toronto Maple Leafs
Again a free agent the following offseason, Benn continued his NHL journey by signing a one-year, $750,000 contract with the Toronto Maple Leafs on July 14, 2022, the second day of free agency. After missing time with a groin injury, Benn played in his first game with the Maple Leafs on November 12, scoring his first goal with the team.

Career statistics

References

External links

1987 births
Allen Americans players
Canadian expatriate ice hockey players in the United States
Canadian ice hockey defencemen
Dallas Stars players
Ice hockey people from British Columbia
Living people
Minnesota Wild players
Montreal Canadiens players
Sportspeople from Victoria, British Columbia
Texas Stars players
Toronto Maple Leafs players
Toronto Marlies players
Undrafted National Hockey League players
Vancouver Canucks players
Victoria Salmon Kings players
Winnipeg Jets players